Val-de-Fier (literally Vale of Fier) is a former commune in the Haute-Savoie department in the Auvergne-Rhône-Alpes region in south-eastern France. On 1 January 2019, it was merged into the new commune Vallières-sur-Fier. Its nearest town is Rumilly.

Geography
The Fier forms most of the commune's south-western border.

History
Val-de-Fier was formed in 1973 from two different villages : Sion and Saint-André.

Population
1962 : 238 inhabitants.
1968 : 266 inhabitants.
1975 : 256 inhabitants.
1982 : 296 inhabitants.
1990 : 317 inhabitants.
1999 : 389 inhabitants.
2006 : 513 inhabitants.

Mayors
Before 1991: Louis Dumont
1991 - 2001: Paul Terrier
Since 2001: Maurice Popp

See also
Communes of the Haute-Savoie department

References

Former communes of Haute-Savoie
Populated places disestablished in 2019